Jordan Andrew Tice (born April 9, 1987) is an American guitarist and vocalist based in Nashville, Tennessee. He is known for his solo work in the progressive bluegrass and Americana genres, and through collaborative projects such as Hawktail, which features Brittany Haas, Paul Kowert, and Dominick Leslie.

Early life
Tice was born and raised in Annapolis, MD. His parents both played bluegrass music. His mother, Sue Raines, performed and recorded in the 1970s with Buffalo Gals, one of the earliest all-female bluegrass groups. Tice started out playing rock guitar but soon switched to taking jazz and classical lessons. He went on to earn a degree in music and composition from Towson University. He moved to Boston in 2009, then New York City from 2012–15, and has been based in Nashville since 2015.

Career

Since 2005, Tice has released five solo records in addition to performing and recording on many collaborative projects. He has had a long relationship with Patuxent Music, a well known bluegrass label from Rockville, Maryland. His first three records were instrumental and featured many of his original compositions while Horse County was the first to feature singing. His most recent album, Motivational Speakeasy, was produced by Kenneth Pattengale of The Milk Carton Kids and released on Padiddle Records (founded by Paul Kowert of Punch Brothers).

In addition to his solo work, he has performed and recorded with the progressive instrumental roots band Hawktail, and its predecessor trio Haas Kowert Tice, as well as a trio composed of himself, banjoist Wes Corbett (Joy Kills Sorrow), and hammered dulcimer player Simon Chrisman. Tice has also played on records from Adam Hurt, Andrew Marlin (Mandolin Orange), David Rawlings Machine, and Carrie Newcomer. He played guitar on The John Hartford Fiddle Tune Project, Vol 1 which was nominated for a 2021 Grammy Award in the bluegrass category.

Some of his biggest early instrumental influences were progressive bluegrass musicians like Tony Rice and Béla Fleck and more recently songwriters with a traditional music background such as Norman Blake, John Hartford, and Bob Dylan. Tice has performed around the world and made appearances at festivals such as Telluride, Grey Fox, Strawberry Music Festival, and RockyGrass. In 2012, alongside Tony Trischka he performed the music for Steve Martin's score for As You Like It (Shakespeare in the Park). He also frequently performs with Yola, including on her Tiny Desk (From Home) show.

American Songwriter noted that Motivational Speakeasy conveys Tice's "considerable evolution as one of the prime movers of the modern newgrass movement." Main Street Nashville wrote that "Motivational Speakeasy is like nothing you’ve ever heard before. He is a musicians’ musician playing exactly as he pleases, and the end result is nothing short of remarkable." PopMatters highlighted his song "Bad Little Idea" and wrote that "for one as musically adept as him... the intricacies of his performance are best met by a feeling of irreverence." The Seattle Post-Intelligencer praised Tice's new solo work as "a reminder of how much you can accomplish with just a guitar, a compelling voice, and a batch of appealing songs.

Discography

Solo 

 Motivational Speakeasy (2020)
 Horse County (2016)
 The Secret History (2011)
 Long Story (2008)
 No Place Better (2006)

with Hawktail 

 Formations (2020)
 Unless (2018)
 Place of Growth (2022)

with Haas Kowert Tice 

 You Got This (2014)

other recording projects 

 Fire and Fable (2021), Andrew Marlin
 Witching Hour (2021), Andrew Marlin
 Back to the Earth (2020), Adam Hurt
 Alexa Wildish (2020), Alexa Wildish
 The John Hartford Fiddle Tune Project, Vol 1 (2020), various artists
 The Beautiful Not Yet (2016), Carrie Newcomer
 Nashville Obsolete (2015), Dave Rawlings Machine
 Corbett/Chrisman/Tice (2008), Corbett/Chrisman/Tice
 Ownself Blues (2008), Frank Wakefield

References

External links
 Official Website

1987 births
Living people
Towson University alumni
21st-century American male musicians
Bluegrass musicians
21st-century American guitarists
Guitarists from Maryland